The 2012–13 Alemannia Aachen season is the 113th season in the club's football history. In 2012–13, the club plays in the 3. Liga, the third tier of German football. It is the clubs first-ever season in this league, having been relegated from the 2. Bundesliga in 2012.

Review and events

The club also took part in the 2012–13 edition of the DFB-Pokal, the German Cup, but was knocked out in the first round by Bundesliga side Borussia Mönchengladbach.

Matches

Legend

Friendly matches

3. Liga

League results and fixtures

League table

Overall table

Table summary

DFB-Pokal

FVM-Pokal

Squad

Squad, matches played and goals scored

|-
|colspan="14"|Players sold or loaned out after the start of the season:

|}

Notes
2 Player from the youth teams.

Minutes played

Bookings

Transfers

In

Out

Sources

External links
 2012–13 Alemannia Aachen season at Weltfussball.de 
 2012–13 Alemannia Aachen season at kicker.de 
 2012–13 Alemannia Aachen season at Fussballdaten.de 

Alemannia Aachen
Alemannia Aachen seasons